is the 24th single by Japanese entertainer Akina Nakamori. Written by Mayumi Itō and Kazuya Izumi, the single was released on July 17, 1990, by Warner Pioneer through the Reprise label. It was also the lead single from her fifth compilation album Best III.

Background 
"Dear Friend" marked Nakamori's return to the music charts one year after her suicide attempt. According to Warner Pioneer chief producer Katsumi Fujikura, the song was selected as Nakamori's next single because it "gives courage, energy, and makes people who listen to it brighter." Nakamori recorded the song at The Hit Factory in New York City. At the same time, she traveled to the Bahamas to shoot the music video, as well as have photographs taken for her photo book My Life 1990: A-K-I-N-A Nakamori.

Chart performance 
"Dear Friend" became Nakamori's 21st No. 1 on Oricon's weekly singles chart and sold over 547,900 copies. It was also certified Platinum by the RIAJ.

Track listing

Charts

Certification

References

External links 
 
 
 

1990 singles
1990 songs
Akina Nakamori songs
Japanese-language songs
Warner Music Japan singles
Reprise Records singles
Oricon Weekly number-one singles